Chionodes baro is a moth in the family Gelechiidae. It is found in North America, where it has been recorded from Connecticut to Oklahoma and North Carolina.

References

Chionodes
Moths described in 1999
Moths of North America